Armenia participated in the 2010 Summer Youth Olympics in Singapore.

Medalists

Participants
Vasil Shahnazaryan
Diana Khubeshyan
Hrayr Matevosyan
Edgar Babayan
Gevorg Papoyan
Vahan Vardanyan
Davit Ghazaryan
Romik Vardumyan
Anahit Barseghyan
Sergey Pevnev
Smbat Margaryan
Gor Minasyan
Artak Hovhannisyan
Varos Petrosyan

Archery

Boys

Mixed

Athletics

Girls
Track and Road Events

Boxing

Boys

Canoeing

Boys

Diving

Boys

Gymnastics

Artistic Gymnastics

Boys

Judo

Individual

Team

Shooting

Pistol

Swimming

Weightlifting

Wrestling

Freestyle

Greco-Roman

References

External links
Competitors List: Armenia

Nations at the 2010 Summer Youth Olympics
2010 in Armenian sport
Armenia at the Youth Olympics